Sovremennik (The Contemporary) was a Russian monthly magazine of "literature, politics, science, history, art and social life". It was published from 1911 to 1915 in Saint Petersburg. Its political philosophy was a cross between Narodism and Marxism. The first editor was Alexander Amfiteatrov with the support of Maxim Gorky who withdrew under the influence of Vladimir Lenin.

References 

Magazines established in 1911
Magazines disestablished in 1915
Russian-language magazines
Literary magazines published in Russia
Magazines published in Saint Petersburg
Defunct literary magazines published in Europe
Monthly magazines published in Russia
Defunct magazines published in Russia